Coralliophila costata is a species of sea snail, a marine gastropod mollusk, in the family Muricidae, the murex snails or rock snails.

Description
The length of the shell attains 23.9 mm.

Distribution
This species occurs in the Pacific Ocean off Mexico.

References

 Blainville H.M.D. de , 1832. Disposition méthodique des espèces récentes et fossiles des genres Pourpre, Ricinule, Licorne et Concholépas de M. de Lamarck et description des espèces nouvelles ou peu connues, faisant partie de la collection du Muséum d'Histoire naturelle de Paris. Nouvelles Annales du Muséum d'Histoire naturelle 1: 189-264
 Lamy, Ed., 1918. Notes sur quelques espèces de Purpura déterminées par Blainville dans la collection du Muséum de Paris. Bulletin du Muséum national d'Histoire naturelle 24: 352-357
 Turgeon, D.; Quinn, J.F.; Bogan, A.E.; Coan, E.V.; Hochberg, F.G.; Lyons, W.G.; Mikkelsen, P.M.; Neves, R.J.; Roper, C.F.E.; Rosenberg, G.; Roth, B.; Scheltema, A.; Thompson, F.G.; Vecchione, M.; Williams, J.D. (1998). Common and scientific names of aquatic invertebrates from the United States and Canada: mollusks. 2nd ed. American Fisheries Society Special Publication, 26. American Fisheries Society: Bethesda, MD (USA). . IX, 526 + cd-rom pp.

External links
 MNHN, Paris: holotype

costata
Gastropods described in 1832